Volchanskoye is a rural locality (a selo) and the administrative center of Volchanskoye Rural Settlement, Kamensky District, Voronezh Oblast, Russia. The population was 464 as of 2010. There are 7 streets.

Geography 
Volchanskoye is located 17 km northeast of Kamenka (the district's administrative centre) by road. Krutets is the nearest rural locality.

References 

Rural localities in Kamensky District, Voronezh Oblast